Aquhorthies College or Aquhorthies House, located between Blairdaff and Inverurie in Aberdeenshire, was a Roman Catholic seminary in Scotland from 1799 to 1829. At the time it was the only Catholic seminary in the east of Scotland. The house still stands today as a private residence. It is a Category A listed building and is very close to the Easter Aquhorthies stone circle.

History
Originally, priests for the east part of Scotland, or the Vicariate Apostolic of the Lowland District were trained at Scalan college from 1717 to 1799. The house was very small and could accommodate just over six students, with one priest in charge. As numbers rose, a larger and less remote site was sought.

The house was originally owned by the Leslies of Balquhain, who also owned Balquhain Castle. In the early 17th century, the land was leased by John Seton, the chamberlain to Earl of Dunfermline at Fyvie Castle.

In 1799, Bishop George Hay moved the college from Scalan to Aquhorthies. In fact, he died at the college on 15 October 1811. The college continued until 1829, when it was merged with the Catholic seminary in Lismore, and they were both closed and the students were transferred to the larger Blairs College which continued as a seminary until 1986. The records of Aquhorthies were transferred to the University of Aberdeen in 1956.

See also
 Roman Catholicism in Scotland

References

1799 establishments in Scotland
Category A listed buildings in Aberdeenshire
Catholic seminaries in Scotland
Educational institutions established in 1799
Educational institutions disestablished in 1829
Listed educational buildings in Scotland
Former theological colleges in Scotland